Siah Sang (also Romanized as Sīāh Sang) is a village in Zaveh Rural District, in the Central District of Zaveh County, Razavi Khorasan Province, Iran. At the 2006 census, its population was 396, in 79 families.

References 

Populated places in Zaveh County